Chebera Churchura National Park is a national park located in South West Ethiopia Peoples' Region in the southwest of Ethiopia. The park was founded by the regional government in 2005. The park is located 133 km south from Jimma and 483 km southwest from Addis Ababa.

Ecology

Flora
The park covers 1,250 km2 and contains four types of habitat. Most of the park which is covered by 62% is wooded grassland dominated by elephant grass (Pennisetum purpureum), with montane woodland comprising 29% along with woodland and riparian forest the rest. Palm trees are significantly diverse within the park's ecoregion.

Fauna
The park is home to 37 species of large mammals and 237 species of birds. The park protects the herds of African Elephants that are abundantly rare within the protected forest areas and open grasslands. Mammals that are also found in Chebera Churchura national park include Lions, Leopards, Servals, Greater kudus, colobus monkeys, Vervet monkeys, hippos, Defassa waterbucks, warthogs, and Cape buffalos.

References

2. All about the elephant in Chebera Churchura park. This is an Amharic video made by FANA Broadcasting Corporation showing an interview with the director of the park .

External links
 Chebera Churchura National Park website
 Enhanced Management and Enforcement of Ethiopia's Protected Area Estate Website

National parks of Ethiopia
Protected areas of Southern Nations, Nationalities, and Peoples' Region
Protected areas established in 2006
2006 establishments in Ethiopia
Ethiopian Highlands
Ethiopian montane moorlands